Cavargna is a comune (municipality) in the Province of Como in the Italian region Lombardy, located about  north of Milan and about  north of Como, on the border with Switzerland.

The municipality of Cavargna contains the frazioni (subdivisions, mainly villages and hamlets) Vegna, Mondrago, and Segalè.

Cavargna borders the following municipalities: Bogno (Switzerland), Ponte Capriasca (Switzerland), San Nazzaro Val Cavargna, Sant'Antonio (Switzerland), Valcolla (Switzerland), Val Rezzo.

Demographic evolution

References

Cities and towns in Lombardy